Becky Sundstrom (born May 10, 1976) is an American speed skater. She competed at the 1998 Winter Olympics and the 2002 Winter Olympics. Her sisters Shana and Tama were also international speed skaters.

References

External links
 

1976 births
Living people
American female speed skaters
Olympic speed skaters of the United States
Speed skaters at the 1998 Winter Olympics
Speed skaters at the 2002 Winter Olympics
People from Glen Ellyn, Illinois
21st-century American women